Wijda Mazereeuw (born 11 August 1953) is a retired swimmer from the Netherlands. Individually she competed in the 200 m and 400 m medley event at the 1972 Summer Olympics and in the 100 m and 200 m breaststroke at the 1976 Summer Olympics, but was eliminated in the heats on all occasions; in 1976 she also placed fifth with the Dutch 4 × 100 m medley relay team. At the 1975 World Aquatics Championships in Cali, Colombia, she won silver medals in the 100 m (1:14.29) and 200 m (2:37.50) breaststroke; she was also part of the Dutch 4 × 100 m medley relay team that won the bronze medal with a time of 4:21.45. 

Mazereeuw competed at the 1974 and 1977 European championships, with the best result of fourth place with the 4 × 100 m medley relay team in 1976. Between 1972 and 1977 she set 15 national records in various events.

References

1953 births
Living people
Dutch female breaststroke swimmers
Dutch female butterfly swimmers
Dutch female medley swimmers
Swimmers at the 1972 Summer Olympics
Swimmers at the 1976 Summer Olympics
Olympic swimmers of the Netherlands
People from Enkhuizen
World Aquatics Championships medalists in swimming
Sportspeople from North Holland
20th-century Dutch women